Mehdikhan (also Romanized as Mehdīkhān and Mehdī Khān; also known as Maekhāneh) is a village in Qaslan Rural District, Serishabad District, Qorveh County, Kurdistan Province, Iran. At the 2006 census, its population was 229, in 69 families. The village is populated by Azerbaijanis with a Kurdish minority.

References 

Towns and villages in Qorveh County
Azerbaijani settlements in Kurdistan Province
Kurdish settlements in Kurdistan Province